Milíře  (Tachauer Brand, Albersdörfer Brand) is a municipality and village in Tachov District in the Plzeň Region of the Czech Republic. It has about 200 inhabitants.

Administrative parts
The village of Zadní Milíře is an administrative part of Milíře.

Etyomology

The name literally means "charcoal piles".

Geography
It lies in the Upper Palatinate Forest.

History
The first written mention of Milíře is from 1669. Zadní Milíře was first mentioned in 1778.

In 1946, most German-speaking inhabitants were expelled. After the war, the area was only partly repopulated.

Sights
The landmark of Milíře is the Church of Saints Peter and Paul. It was built in the Neoclassical style in 1814–1816. Together with the rectory, school, memorial cross and World War I memorial, it forms a valuable set of historical buildings.

References

External links

 

Villages in Tachov District